Kelly Jones (born March 31, 1964) is an American former doubles world No. 1 tennis player. Jones reached the finals in doubles at the Australian and US Opens in 1992. He is currently the Head Men's Tennis Coach at Furman University in Greenville, South Carolina.

Biography
Jones played varsity tennis at Pepperdine University from 1982 to 1985, where he won the NCAA Division 1 doubles title in 1984 and 1985. He was a member of the 1984 Los Angeles Olympic Games U.S. tennis team.

Jones joined the professional tour in 1986. He won his first top-level doubles title in 1987 at Auckland.

In 1988, Jones finished runner-up in the mixed doubles at Wimbledon, partnering Gretchen Magers.

Jones was runner-up in the men's doubles at both the Australian Open and the US Open in 1992, partnering Rick Leach. In October that year, he reached the World No. 1 doubles ranking for 1 week.

After 12 years on the professional tour, Jones retired in 1998. During his career, he won eight top-level doubles titles. Jones also won a tour singles event in Singapore, where he captured the title both in 1989 and 1990. His best singles performance at a Grand Slam event was at the 1993 Australian Open, where he reached the fourth round. His career-high singles ranking was World No. 86 (in 1990). Jones' career prize-money earnings totaled US$1,165,009.

Since retiring from the tour, Jones has coached high-profile players including Mardy Fish, Xavier Malisse and James Blake. 

Jones is married to Tami Whitlinger, a former professional tennis player.

Career finals

Singles (2 wins)

Doubles (8 wins - 10 losses)

Doubles performance timeline

External links
 
 

American male tennis players
American tennis coaches
Olympic tennis players of the United States
Furman Paladins men's tennis coaches
Pepperdine Waves men's tennis players
Tennis players from Tampa, Florida
Tennis people from Georgia (U.S. state)
Tennis players at the 1984 Summer Olympics
1964 births
Living people
Competitors at the 1986 Goodwill Games
ATP number 1 ranked doubles tennis players